West Middlesex may refer to:

 West Middlesex Hospital, England
 West Middlesex, Pennsylvania, U.S.

See also
 Middlesex (disambiguation)